Nicholas B. Corwin was an eight-year-old boy murdered by Laurie Dann, a mentally ill woman, in a Winnetka, Illinois elementary school on May 20, 1988.

Dann also shot several other students, all of whom survived, then took a family hostage and set a fire in their house before committing suicide. Earlier that day, she had tried to poison several acquaintances and set fires in a school and a daycare.

People involved

Nick Corwin 
Corwin was born on April 9, 1980, to Joel and Linda Corwin. In school he was an athlete known for his sportsmanship and skill.

Corwin is the namesake of a popular soccer field and playground in Winnetka. 

According to a report in People magazine, 1,500 people attended his funeral.

Shortly after his death, playing on the meaning of his name (“giver of gifts”) his friends and schoolmates created a book, The Gifts that Nicholas Gave. He was remembered for his sportsmanship, kindness, and leadership.

Classmates remembered Corwin for his exemplary play. One told a reporter that the other children would not be able to play fairly, because Nick was the one who knew all the rules.

He is interred at Memorial Park Cemetery in Skokie, Illinois.

Following his death, Winnetka passed a handgun ban, which stood until D.C. vs Heller and subsequent NRA lawsuits.

Laurie Dann née Wasserman

Early life 
Wasserman was born October 18, 1957 in Chicago and grew up in Glencoe, a north suburb of Chicago. She was the daughter of an accountant, Norman Wasserman, and his wife, Edith Joy.

Those who knew Wasserman described her as shy and withdrawn. She graduated from New Trier High School in Winnetka, Illinois, in 1975, and although she had poor grades in high school she was able to attend Drake University in Des Moines, Iowa. When her grades improved, she transferred to the University of Arizona with the goal of becoming a teacher. She began dating a pre-med student, and the relationship soon became serious, but she was becoming possessive and demanding.  In the summer of 1977 she attended the University of Wisconsin in Madison, taking a course in home economics.

In 1980, with the relationship failing, Wasserman moved back to her parents' home.  She then transferred to Northwestern University to complete her degree, but she dropped out of all her classes and never graduated.

Marriage and divorce 
She met and married Russell Dann, an executive in an insurance broker firm in September 1982, but the marriage quickly soured as Russell's family noted signs of obsessive-compulsive disorder and strange behavior including leaving trash around the house. She saw a psychiatrist for a short period, who identified her childhood and upbringing as a cause of her problems.

Laurie and Russell Dann separated in October 1985. The divorce negotiations were acrimonious, with Laurie claiming that Russell was abusive. In the following months, the police were called to investigate various incidents, including several harassing phone calls made to Russell and his family.  In April 1986, Dann accused Russell of breaking into and vandalizing her parents' house, where she was then living. Shortly after, she purchased a Smith & Wesson Model 19 .357 Magnum, telling the salesman that she needed it for self-defense. The police were concerned about her gun ownership and unsuccessfully tried to persuade Dann and her family that she should give up the gun.

In August 1986, she contacted her ex-boyfriend, who was by then a resident at a hospital, and claimed to have had his child. When he refused to believe her, Dann called the hospital where he worked and claimed he had raped her in the emergency room.

In September 1986, Russell Dann reported he had been stabbed in his sleep with an icepick. He accused Laurie of the crime, although he had not actually seen his attacker. The police decided not to press charges against Laurie based on a medical report which suggested that the injury might have been self-inflicted, as well as Russell's abrasive attitude towards the police and his failed polygraph test. Russell and his family continued to receive harassing hang-up phone calls, and Laurie was arrested for calls made to Russell's sister. The charges were dropped due to lack of evidence.

Just before their divorce was finalized in April 1987, Laurie accused Russell of raping her. There were no physical signs supporting Laurie's claim, although she passed two polygraph tests.  In May 1987, Laurie accused Russell of placing an incendiary device in her home. No charges were filed against Russell for either alleged event. Laurie's parents believed her claims and supported and defended her throughout. By this time, Laurie Dann was being treated by another psychiatrist for obsessive-compulsive disorder and a "chemical imbalance"; the psychiatrist told police that he did not think Laurie was suicidal or homicidal.

Final year 
Dann worked as a babysitter, and some employers were happy with the care she provided their children.  Others made complaints to the police about damage to their furniture and the theft of food and clothes.  Despite the complaints, no charges were pressed. Dann's father did pay for damages in one case.

In the summer of 1987, Dann sublet a university apartment in Evanston, Illinois. Once again, her strange behavior was noted, including riding up and down in elevators for hours, wearing rubber gloves to touch metal, and leaving meat to rot in sofa cushions. She took no classes at the university.

In the fall of 1987, Dann claimed she had received threatening letters from Russell and that he had sexually assaulted her in a parking lot, but the police did not believe her. A few weeks later, she purchased a .32-caliber Smith & Wesson Model 30-1 revolver.

With her condition deteriorating, Dann and her family sought specialized help.  In November 1987, she moved to Madison, Wisconsin, to live in a student residence while being observed by a psychiatrist who specialized in obsessive-compulsive disorder. She had already begun taking clomipramine, a drug for OCD, and her new psychiatrist increased the dosage, adding lithium carbonate to reduce her mood swings and initiating behavioral therapy to work on her phobias and ritualistic behaviors. Despite the intervention, her strange behavior continued, including riding elevators for long periods, changing television channels repetitively, and an obsession with "good" and "bad" numbers. There were also concerns about whether she was bulimic.

Dann purchased a .22-caliber Beretta 21A Bobcat at the end of December 1987. In March 1988, she stopped attending her appointments with the psychiatrist and behavior therapist. At about the same time, she began to make preparations for the attacks. She stole books from the library on poisons, and she diluted arsenic and other chemicals from a lab. She also shoplifted clothes and wigs to disguise herself and was arrested for theft on one occasion. Both her psychiatrist and her father tried to persuade her to enter the hospital as an inpatient, but she refused.

Dann continued to make numerous hang-up phone calls to her former in-laws and babysitting clients. Eventually, the calls escalated to death threats. An ex-boyfriend and his wife also received dozens of threatening calls. In May 1988, a letter, later confirmed to have been sent by Laurie Dann, was sent to the hospital administration where her ex-boyfriend then worked, again accusing him of sexual assault. Since the phone calls were across state lines, the FBI became involved, and a federal indictment against Dann was prepared. However, the ex-boyfriend, fearful of publicity, and concerned about Dann getting bail and then attempting to fulfill her threats against him, decided to wait until other charges were filed in Illinois.  In May 1988, a janitor found her lying in the fetal position inside a garbage bag in a trash room.  This precipitated a search of her room and her departure back to Glencoe.

Attacks
During the days before May 20, 1988, Dann prepared rice cereal snacks and juice boxes poisoned with the diluted arsenic she had stolen in Madison. She mailed them to a former acquaintance, ex-babysitting clients, her psychiatrist, Russell Dann, and others. In the early morning of May 20, she personally delivered snacks and juice "samples" to acquaintances, and families for whom she had babysat, some of whom had not seen her for years. Other snacks were delivered to Alpha Tau Omega, Psi Upsilon, and Kappa Sigma fraternity houses and Leverone Hall at Northwestern University in Evanston. Notes were attached to some of the deliveries.
The drinks were often leaking and the squares unpleasant-tasting, so few were actually consumed. In addition, the arsenic was highly diluted so nobody became seriously ill.

At about 9  on the 20th, Dann arrived at the home of the Rushe family, former babysitting clients in Winnetka, Illinois, to pick up their two youngest children. The family had just told Dann they were moving away. Instead of taking the children on the promised outing, she took them to Ravinia Elementary School in Highland Park, Illinois, where she erroneously believed that both of her former sister-in-law's two sons were enrolled (in fact, one of Dann's intended targets was not even a student at the school). She left the two children in the car while she entered the school and tried to detonate a fire bomb in one of the school's hallways. After Dann's departure, the small fire she set was subsequently discovered by students, and quickly extinguished by a teacher. She drove to a local daycare attended by her ex-sister-in-law's daughter and tried to enter the building with a plastic can of gasoline, but was stopped by staff.

Next Dann drove the children back to their home and offered them some arsenic-poisoned milk, but the boys spat it out because it tasted strange to them. Once at their home, she lured them downstairs and used gasoline to set fire to the house, trapping their mother and the two children in the basement, which they managed to escape from.
She drove three and a half blocks to the Hubbard Woods Elementary School with three handguns in her possession. She wandered into a second grade classroom for a short while, then left. Finding a boy in the corridor, Dann pushed him into the boys' washroom and shot him with a .22 semi-automatic Beretta pistol. Her Smith & Wesson .357 Magnum revolver jammed when she tried to fire it at two other boys, and she threw it into the trash along with its spare ammunition. The boys ran out of the washroom and raised the alarm. Dann then reentered the second grade classroom where students were working in groups on a bicycle safety test. She ordered all the children into the corner of the room. The teacher refused and attempted to disarm Dann, managing to unload the Beretta in the struggle. Dann drew a .32 Smith & Wesson from the waistband of her shorts and aimed it at several groups of the students. She shot five children, killing eight year-old Nick Corwin and wounding two girls and two boys before fleeing in her car.

Dann was prevented from leaving the area by car because the roads were closed for a funeral cortege. She decided to drive her car backwards down the nearby street, but the road dead-ended into a private drive. Abandoning her car, she removed her bloodstained shorts and tied a blue garbage bag around her waist. With her two remaining guns she made her way through the woods and came upon the house of the Andrew family. Dann entered the house and met a mother and her twenty-year-old son, who were in the kitchen. She claimed she was raped and had shot the rapist in the struggle.
The Andrews were sympathetic and tried to convince her that she need not fear the police because she had acted in self-defense. Mrs. Andrew gave Dann a pair of her daughter's pants to wear. While she was putting them on, Philip Andrew was able to pick up and pocket the Beretta. He suggested that she call her family. Dann agreed and called her mother, telling her she had done something terrible, and that the police were involved. Philip took the phone and explained Dann's story about the rape and shooting, suggesting that Mrs. Wasserman come to get Dann; Mrs. Wasserman said she could not come because she did not have a car.

Mr. Andrew arrived home, and they continued to argue with Dann, insisting she give up the second gun. Dann called her mother again and this time Mr. Andrew spoke with Mrs. Wasserman, asking her to persuade Dann to give up the gun. While Dann spoke with her mother, Mrs. Andrew left the house and alerted the police. Mr. Andrew told Dann that he would not remain in the house if she did not put down the gun, and also left the house. Dann ordered Philip to stay. Just before noon, seeing the police advancing on the house she shot Philip in the chest, but he managed to escape out the back door before collapsing and being rescued by the police and ambulance personnel.

With the house surrounded, Dann went upstairs to a bedroom. The Wassermans and Russell Dann were brought to the house. At about 7 , an assault team entered the house while Mr. Wasserman attempted to get Dann's attention with a bullhorn. The police found her body in the bedroom; she had shot herself in the mouth.

Aftermath
Corwin's murder at a school was among the first to feature prominently in the 24-hour news cycle, mostly revolving around the mental state of Dann. Because no other school shooting had received such wide coverage, Corwin's murder is sometimes called “the first school shooting.” Since his murder, a school shooting was widely reported almost every year. Others noted that his shooting marked an “end of innocence” for the prosperous community along Chicago's North Shore, which had not had a murder in 30 years.

All but one of the victims wounded by Dann recovered from their injuries, including the schoolgirl who was shot and suffered severe internal injuries. The victims, school children, and parents received extensive support to help them cope with the psychological after-effects of the attacks.

Parents and members of the community subsequently devoted many years to gun control policy.  Philip Andrew gave interviews about gun control from his hospital bed, and later became active in local and state gun control organizations as the executive director of the Illinois Council Against Handgun Violence; he subsequently became a lawyer and then an FBI agent.

Dr. Donald Monroe, superintendent of Winnetka School District 36 noted “his ‘safe’ school” was “not as isolated and insulated as we thought.” At the time of the shooting, Hubbard Woods, like many schools, was an open campus, with many doors, such as those to individual classrooms, kept open. After the shooting, a pattern of single-point entry emerged in more schools.

The Dann shootings also fueled the debate about criteria for committing mentally ill people to mental health facilities against their will. Some favored the involuntary commitment of a person who is determined to be mentally ill and incapable of making informed decisions about treatment; civil libertarians like Benjamin Wolf (staff counsel for the ACLU of Illinois) opposed the idea saying, "It would be a shame if we cut back on the civil liberties of literally millions of mentally ill people because of the occasional bizarre incident."

A book called Murder of Innocence was written by Eric Zorn about the tragedy, and a made-for-television film of the same name was based on it.  In the film, Dann's name is changed to Laurie Wade. She was played by Valerie Bertinelli. Russell Dann helped coach Bertinelli while she was preparing for the role.

Search for a rationale
Some blamed Dann's family for defending and protecting her in spite of the signs of her deteriorating mental health. Investigations were hampered by the Wassermans' refusal to be interviewed by police or to provide access to Dann's psychiatric records—the records were eventually obtained by court order. On the night of Dann's death, the Wassermans allowed only a very brief search of her bedroom, after which they cleaned it and removed potential evidence. The police were criticized for not sealing off Dann's room as part of the crime scene.  Parents of the shooting victims subsequently sued the Wasserman family for damages.

Further criticism was directed at Dann's psychiatrists for failing to identify or take action regarding the signs of Dann's decreasing mental stability. At the time of her suicide, Dann was taking an unlicensed drug, clomipramine. The effects of this drug were initially considered as contributing factors to Dann's mental well-being, but ultimately ruled out.

Two newspaper clippings were found among Dann's possessions after her death. One described a man who randomly killed two people in a public building. The other described a depressed young man who had attempted to commit suicide in the same way that Dann did; he survived and discovered that his brain injury had cured him of his obsessive-compulsive disorder.

One theory of Dann's rationale was that she targeted people who had "disappointed" her in some way: her ex-husband, her former sister-in-law (through the firebombing attempts at her children's schools and daycare), her ex-boyfriend and his wife, the family who was moving away, as well as former friends and babysitting clients.

Dann was also briefly investigated as a possible suspect in the Chicago Tylenol murders, but no direct connection was found.

In his book The Myth of Male Power, author Warren Farrell suggested that Laurie Dann's actions were an example of women's violence against men. He claimed, erroneously, that all of Dann's victims were male, that she burned down a Young Men's Jewish Council, burned two boys in a basement, shot her own son, and alleged that she killed an eight-year old rapist. Men's rights activists, academics, and the media have repeated Farrell's errors and conclusion. Farrell later issued a correction on his web site.

Footnotes

References

1988 mass shootings in the United States
1988 murders in the United States
Arson in Illinois
Attacks in the United States in 1988
Crimes in Illinois
Hostage taking in the United States
Mass shootings in the United States
Murder–suicides in Illinois
Suicides by firearm in Illinois
1988 suicides
School shootings in the United States